Lazare is a 1902 French-language /oratorio by Alfred Bruneau to an 1896 poem by Émile Zola.

Recording
Louis-Jacques Rondeleux as Lazarus, Jean Giraudeau as Jesus, Giselle Desmoutiers as Lazarus' wife, Claudine Collart as the child, Helene Bouvier as Lazarus' mother, Orchestre Radio-Symphonique de Paris, Eugène Bigot 1957

References

Opera oratorios
1902 compositions
French-language operas
Compositions by Alfred Bruneau
Operas based on literature